Karel Wellner (5 March 1875, in Unhošť – 14 June 1926, in Olomouc) was a Czech graphic artist, painter, cartoonist, illustrator, art historian and critic. He was also a secondary school teacher and professor.

He graduated from high school in Prague, and then studied industrial engineering and art  in Prague. He moved to Olomouc in 1902 and was active in illustrating professional literature and as an art historian. Some of his works were published in Germany. As a painter he took part in exhibitions in Prague and with the Association of Visual Artists in Moravia. He was active mainly in  graphic art. He has published several lithographs and etchings of the old city of Olomouc.

See also
List of Czech painters

References

Czech graphic designers
Czech illustrators
Czech art critics
1875 births
1926 deaths
20th-century Czech painters
Czech male painters
People from Kladno District
20th-century Czech male artists
Austro-Hungarian artists